The Ascension crake (Mundia elpenor) is an extinct flightless bird that previously lived on Ascension Island in the South Atlantic Ocean. Like many other flightless birds on isolated islands, it was a rail. It was declared extinct by Groombridge in 1994; BirdLife International confirmed this in 2000 and 2004.

The bird was endemic to Ascension Island. Numerous subfossil bones of the bird have been found in deposits at the base of vertical fumaroles. Peter Mundy, a 17th-century merchant and traveler gave an account of the bird and made a sketch of it when he visited Ascension Island in June 1656. It was described by Mundy as:

It most likely lived in the near-desert areas of the island and primarily ate sooty tern (Sterna fuscata) eggs. It is probable that it became extinct after rats were introduced to the island in the 18th century, but it may have survived until the introduction of feral cats in 1815.

The bird was regarded by Storrs Olson as a relative of Atlantisia rogersi, but recent analysis (Bourne et al., 2003) has shown that the differences between the two are greater than previously appreciated. The new genus Mundia (named after the discoverer Peter Mundy) was created in 2003.

References

BirdLife Species Factsheet
del Hoyo, J., Elliott, A., & Sargatal, J., eds. Handbook of Birds of the World Vol. 3: 140, 175. Lynx Edicions, Barcelona. .
 Bourne, W. R. P., Ashmole, N. P. & Simmons K. E. L.: A new subfossil night heron and a new genus for the extinct rail from Ascension Island, central tropical Atlantic Ocean in Ardea; 91, Heft 1, 2003: pp. 45–51 PDF fulltext

Ascension crake
†
Extinct flightless birds
Extinct animals of Africa
Bird extinctions since 1500
Ascension crake
Ascension crake
Extinct birds of Atlantic islands
Species made extinct by human activities